Franklin Lakes is a borough in Bergen County, in the U.S. state of New Jersey. As of the 2020 United States census, the borough's population was 11,079, an increase of 489 (+4.6%) from the 2010 census count of 10,590, which in turn reflected an increase of 168 (+1.6%) from the 10,422 counted in the 2000 census. Becton Dickinson, a Fortune 500 company, is headquartered in Franklin Lakes.

Franklin Lakes was formed by an act of the New Jersey Legislature on March 11, 1922, from portions of Franklin Township, based on the results of a referendum held on April 11, 1922. The borough was named for William Franklin, the illegitimate son of Benjamin Franklin, a steadfast Loyalist who served as the last colonial Governor of New Jersey.

The borough is one of the state's highest-income communities. Based on data from the American Community Survey for 2014–2018, Franklin Lakes residents had a median household income of $159,883, more than double the statewide median. In 2010, Forbes ranked Franklin Lakes at 146th in its listing of "America's Most Expensive ZIP Codes," with a median home price of $1,306,546.

Geography
According to the United States Census Bureau, the borough had a total area of 9.88 square miles (25.60 km2), including 9.41 square miles (24.38 km2) of land and 0.47 square miles (1.21 km2) of water (4.75%).

Unincorporated communities, localities and place names located partially or wholly within the borough include Bakers Pond, Blauvelt Lakes, Campgaw, Crystal Lakes, Ferdinands Mills, Hopper Lake, Pulis Mills and Shadow Lake.

The borough borders the municipalities of Mahwah, Oakland and Wyckoff in Bergen County; and both North Haledon and Wayne in Passaic County.

Demographics

2010 census

The Census Bureau's 2006–2010 American Community Survey showed that (in 2010 inflation-adjusted dollars) median household income was $151,224 (with a margin of error of +/− $16,426) and the median family income was $155,156 (+/− $33,998). Males had a median income of $125,586 (+/− $20,759) versus $63,170 (+/− $13,069) for females. The per capita income for the borough was $74,219 (+/− $9,917). About 0.7% of families and 1.5% of the population were below the poverty line, including 0.7% of those under age 18 and 1.8% of those age 65 or over.

Same-sex couples headed 28 households in 2010, double the 14 counted in 2000.

2000 census
As of the 2000 United States census of 2000, there were 10,422 people, 3,322 households, and 2,959 families residing in the borough. The population density was 1,102.5 people per square mile (425.8/km2). There were 3,395 housing units at an average density of 359.2 per square mile (138.7/km2). The racial makeup of the borough was 91.35% White, 0.92% African American, 0.11% Native American, 6.33% Asian, 0.01% Pacific Islander, 0.41% from other races, and 0.86% from two or more races. Hispanic or Latino people of any race were 2.74% of the population. 29.8% of residents reported being of Italian ancestry in the 2000 Census, the highest percentage recorded as a percentage of borough population.

There were 3,322 households, out of which 43.9% had children under the age of 18 living with them, 82.0% were married couples living together, 4.8% had a female householder with no husband present, and 10.9% were non-families. 8.6% of all households were made up of individuals, and 4.1% had someone living alone who was 65 years of age or older. The average household size was 3.13 and the average family size was 3.34.

In the borough the population was spread out, with 28.7% under the age of 18, 4.9% from 18 to 24, 24.1% from 25 to 44, 31.1% from 45 to 64, and 11.2% who were 65 years of age or older. The median age was 41 years. For every 100 females, there were 97.5 males. For every 100 females age 18 and over, there were 95.7 males.

The median income for a household in the borough was $132,373, and the median income for a family was $142,930. Males had a median income of $97,233 versus $45,588 for females. The per capita income for the borough was $59,763. About 2.6% of families and 3.2% of the population were below the poverty line, including 3.1% of those under age 18 and 6.8% of those age 65 or over.

Economy
Franklin Lakes hosts the corporate headquarters of Becton Dickinson, the medical technology firm founded in 1897. Medco Health Solutions, a leading pharmacy benefit manager (PBM), was based here until it was acquired by Express Scripts, another PBM, in 2012.

Popular culture
Franklin Lakes has been the setting of several reality television shows, including: Bravo network's series The Real Housewives of New Jersey, MTV's My Super Sweet 16, and VH1's My Big Fat Fabulous Wedding. Franklin Lakes was also used for filming the fictional upstate New York town of Dargerville in the Law & Order episode "Knock-Off".

Government

Local government
Franklin Lakes is governed under the Borough form of New Jersey municipal government, which is used in 218 municipalities (of the 564) statewide, making it the most common form of government in New Jersey. The governing body is comprised of a mayor and a borough council, with all positions elected at-large on a partisan basis as part of the November general election. A mayor is elected directly by the voters to a four-year term of office. The borough council is comprised of six members elected to serve three-year terms on a staggered basis, with two seats coming up for election each year in a three-year cycle. The borough form of government used by Franklin Lakes is a "weak mayor / strong council" government in which council members act as the legislative body with the mayor presiding at meetings and voting only in the event of a tie. The mayor can veto ordinances subject to an override by a two-thirds majority vote of the council. The mayor makes committee and liaison assignments for council members, and most appointments are made by the mayor with the advice and consent of the council. All council meetings are held at the Borough Hall located on DeKorte Drive, formerly Municipal Drive.

, the Mayor of Franklin Lakes is Republican Charles J. X. Kahwaty, whose term of office ends on December 31, 2026. Members of the Franklin Lakes Borough Council are Council President Dennis Bonagura (R, 2023; elected to serve an unexpired term), Joel Ansh (R, 2025), Ardith Cardenas (R, 2025), Gail A. Kelly (R, 2023), Thomas G. Lambrix (R, 2024) and Gary Sheppard (R, 2024; appointed to serve an unexpired term).

In July 2021, the borough council chose Susan McGowan to fill the seat expiring in December 2022 that had been held by Dennis Bonagura until resigned from office after the council implemented a nepotism policy that would impact the possibility that his son could have been hired by the borough as a police officer. Bonagura ran for office again in November 2021 and was elected to serve the balance of his own unexpired term.
 
The borough administrator is Gregory C. Hart.

Emergency services
The Franklin Lakes Police Department is headed by Chief Carmine Pezzuti.

The Franklin Lakes Fire Department is an all-volunteer fire department, founded in 1924. The FLFD has two locations, one known as "Headquarters" which is located off of Franklin Avenue, and the other is the "Southside" Firehouse, located on Franklin Lakes Road. The current chief of the FLFD is Chuck Bohny.

The Franklin Lakes Office of Emergency Management is located at 745 Franklin Avenue. The current Emergency Management Coordinator is Joe Barcelo.

Federal, state, and county representation
Franklin Lakes is located in the 9th congressional district and is part of New Jersey's 40th state legislative district.

In redistricting following the 2010 census, the borough was in the 5th congressional district, which was in effect from 2013 to 2022.

Politics
As of March 2011, there was a total of 7,446 registered voters in Franklin Lakes, of whom 1,141 (15.3% vs. 31.7% countywide) were registered as Democrats, 3,307 (44.4% vs. 21.1%) were registered as Republicans, and 2,986 (40.1% vs. 47.1%) were registered as unaffiliated. There were 12 voters registered as Libertarians or Greens. Among the borough's 2010 Census population, 70.3% (vs. 57.1% in Bergen County) were registered to vote, including 96.8% of those ages 18 and over (vs. 73.7% countywide).

In the 2016 presidential election, Republican Donald Trump received 3,721 votes (61.2% vs. 41.1% countywide), ahead of Democrat Hillary Clinton with 2,153 votes (35.4% vs. 54.2%) and other candidates with 202 votes (3.3% vs. 4.6%), among the 6,131 ballots cast by the borough's 8,367 registered voters, for a turnout of 73.3% (vs. 72.5% in Bergen County). In the 2012 presidential election, Republican Mitt Romney received 3,910 votes (69.6% vs. 43.5% countywide), ahead of Democrat Barack Obama with 1,601 votes (28.5% vs. 54.8%) and other candidates with 44 votes (0.8% vs. 0.9%), among the 5,614 ballots cast by the borough's 7,881 registered voters, for a turnout of 71.2% (vs. 70.4% in Bergen County). In the 2008 presidential election, Republican John McCain received 3,818 votes (62.6% vs. 44.5% countywide), ahead of Democrat Barack Obama with 2,206 votes (36.2% vs. 53.9%) and other candidates with 29 votes (0.5% vs. 0.8%), among the 6,095 ballots cast by the borough's 7,698 registered voters, for a turnout of 79.2% (vs. 76.8% in Bergen County). In the 2004 presidential election, Republican George W. Bush received 3,819 votes (65.9% vs. 47.2% countywide), ahead of Democrat John Kerry with 1,923 votes (33.2% vs. 51.7%) and other candidates with 32 votes (0.6% vs. 0.7%), among the 5,792 ballots cast by the borough's 7,251 registered voters, for a turnout of 79.9% (vs. 76.9% in the whole county).

In the 2013 gubernatorial election, Republican Chris Christie received 81.6% of the vote (2,697 cast), ahead of Democrat Barbara Buono with 17.8% (587 votes), and other candidates with 0.6% (20 votes), among the 3,360 ballots cast by the borough's 7,580 registered voters (56 ballots were spoiled), for a turnout of 44.3%. In the 2009 gubernatorial election, Republican Chris Christie received 2,739 votes (69.9% vs. 45.8% countywide), ahead of Democrat Jon Corzine with 1,023 votes (26.1% vs. 48.0%), Independent Chris Daggett with 110 votes (2.8% vs. 4.7%) and other candidates with 17 votes (0.4% vs. 0.5%), among the 3,918 ballots cast by the borough's 7,564 registered voters, yielding a 51.8% turnout (vs. 50.0% in the county).

Education
Students in pre-kindergarten through eighth grade attend the Franklin Lakes Public Schools. As of the 2018–19 school year, the district, comprised of four schools, had an enrollment of 1,121 students and 138.7 classroom teachers (on an FTE basis), for a student–teacher ratio of 8.1:1. Schools in the district (with 2018–19 enrollment data from the National Center for Education Statistics) are 
Colonial Road School with 245 students in grades K–5, 
High Mountain Road School with 218 students in grades Pre-K–5, 
Woodside Avenue School with 254 students in grades K–5 and 
Franklin Avenue Middle School with 418 students in grades 6–8.

Public high school students from Franklin Lakes in ninth through twelfth grades attend the schools of the Ramapo Indian Hills Regional High School District, which also serves students from Oakland and Wyckoff. Before enrolling, students have the option to choose to attend either of the district's high schools. Schools in the high school district (with 2018–19 enrollment data from the National Center for Education Statistics) available to students from Franklin Lakes are
Indian Hills High School, located in Oakland (1,062 students) and
Ramapo High School, located in Franklin Lakes (1,222 students). The district's nine-member board of education oversees the operation of the district; seats on the board are allocated based on population, with two of the nine seats allocated to Franklin Lakes.

Prior to the formation of the regional high school district, students from Franklin Lakes and Wyckoff had attended Ramsey High School as part of a sending/receiving relationship, until the Ramsey Public School District informed officials from the two communities that the Ramsey school would no longer have space to accommodate out-of-district students after the 1956–1957 school year. Franklin Lakes, Oakland and Wyckoff (FLOW district) approved the creation of a regional high school in 1954 by a vote of 1,060 to 51, with Ramapo High School (in Franklin Lakes) opening in 1957 and Indian Hills High School in 1960.

Public school students from the borough, and all of Bergen County, are eligible to attend the secondary education programs offered by the Bergen County Technical Schools, which include the Bergen County Academies in Hackensack, and the Bergen Tech campus in Teterboro or Paramus. The district offers programs on a shared-time or full-time basis, with admission based on a selective application process and tuition covered by the student's home school district.

Academy of the Most Blessed Sacrament is a K–8 elementary school that operates under the auspices of the Roman Catholic Diocese of Newark. In 2016, the school was one of ten schools in New Jersey, and one of four non-public school in the state, recognized as a National Blue Ribbon School by the United States Department of Education.

Transportation

Roads and highways

Interstate 287 enters on the borough's western border with Oakland and heads north towards Mahwah, with the highway's exit 59 in the borough. County Route 502 (Breakneck Road / Franklin Lakes Road) enters from Wayne Township in Passaic County at the borough's southwest corner, runs along the border with Oakland and re-enters Franklin Lakes, heading north towards Wyckoff.

Public transportation
NJ Transit bus route 752 serves Franklin Lakes, providing local service.

From the late 1800s until 1966, Franklin Lakes had passenger train service at the Crystal Lakes and Campgaw stations on the New York, Susquehanna and Western Railway.

Notable people

People who were born in, residents of, or otherwise closely associated with Franklin Lakes include:

 Noelle Bassi (born 1983), butterfly swimmer who won the silver medal in the women's 200m butterfly event at the 2003 Pan American Games
 John Calipari (born 1959), NBA and college basketball coach
 Cindy Callaghan (born ), author of children's books whose first book, Just Add Magic, was adapted into an Amazon television series by the same name
 Harry Carson (born 1953), Pro Football Hall of Fame linebacker who played for the New York Giants; co-host of Fox's Giants Game Plan
 Derrick Coleman (born 1967), former NBA player who played for the New Jersey Nets
 Blake Costanzo (born 1984), football player
 John Culligan (1916–2004), former CEO of American Home Products (later Wyeth, now Pfizer)
 Richard W. DeKorte (1936–1975), former mayor of Franklin Lakes who served as a member of the New Jersey General Assembly
 Kirk DeMicco, screenwriter, director and producer, best known for writing and directing Space Chimps and The Croods
 Dwight Gooden (born 1964), former MLB pitcher for the New York Mets
 Melissa Gorga (born 1979), reality television personality and singer; featured as one of The Real Housewives of New Jersey
 Dan Grunfeld (born 1984), professional basketball player
 Ernie Grunfeld (born 1955), former NBA player and general manager
 Ron Harper Jr. (born 2000), college basketball player for the Rutgers Scarlet Knights
 Morgan Hoffmann (born 1989), professional golfer
 Sam Huff (born 1934), former linebacker and game day radio color commentator for the Washington Redskins, inducted into the Pro Football Hall of Fame
 Michael Jackson (1958–2009), singer, lived in Franklin Lakes during 2007
 Janet Jacobs (1928–2017), shortstop and center fielder who played in the All-American Girls Professional Baseball League
 Tommy John (born 1943), All-Star pitcher who lived in Franklin Lakes while with the New York Yankees
 Carolyn Kaelin (1961–2015), cancer surgeon at the Dana–Farber Cancer Institute who founded the Comprehensive Breast Health Center at Brigham and Women's Hospital in 1995
 Tanya Kalyvas (born 1979), former footballer who played as a midfielder for the Greece women's national team
 Bernard Kerik (born 1955), former New York City Police Commissioner
 Grace Kim (born 1968), former professional tennis player
 Bernard King (born 1956), former player for the New Jersey Nets
 Ross Krautman (born 1991), placekicker for the Syracuse Orange football team
 Jacqueline Laurita (born 1970), cast member on the reality television series The Real Housewives of New Jersey
 Matt LoVecchio (born 1982), starting quarterback for the University of Notre Dame football team 2000–2001, and for Indiana University 2003–2004
 Caroline Manzo (born 1961), cast member on the reality television series The Real Housewives of New Jersey
 Dina Manzo, cast member on the reality television series The Real Housewives of New Jersey
 Gheorghe Mureșan (born 1971), former professional basketball player; at 7'7" (2.31 m), arguably the tallest man to ever play in the NBA
 Tom Murro (born 1966), journalist, columnist, television personality
 Willie Randolph (born 1954), former MLB player and manager for the New York Mets
 Kelly Ripa (born 1970), actress and talk show host
 Chris Simms (born 1980), former NFL quarterback
 Matt Simms (born 1988), NFL quarterback who plays for the New York Jets
 Phil Simms (born 1954), former New York Giants quarterback, football commentator
 John A. Spizziri (born 1934), politician, served in the New Jersey General Assembly 1972–1978
 Gerald L. Storch (born 1956), former CEO of Toys "R" Us
 James "J.T." Taylor (born 1953), singer-songwriter/producer of Kool & the Gang
 Justin Trattou (born 1988), defensive end who has played in the NFL for the New York Giants and Minnesota Vikings
 Keith Van Horn (born 1975), former NBA player who lived in Franklin Lakes during his time with the New Jersey Nets
 Stuart Varney (born 1949), economics journalist
 Kaavya Viswanathan (born 1987), novelist noted for highly publicized plagiarism scandal
 Jack Wallace (born 1998), ice sled hockey player who was a member of the gold medal-winning US team in Para ice hockey at the 2018 Winter Paralympics
 Jane Wyatt (1910–2006), actress known for her role in Father Knows Best; born in Campgaw but raised in New York City
 Jeremy Zucker (born 1996), singer-songwriter best known for his song "Comethru", which has accumulated over 200 million streams on Spotify

Historic sites
Franklin Lakes is home to the following locations on the National Register of Historic Places:

Ackerman-Boyd House – 1095 Franklin Lake Road (added 1983)
Blauvelt House – 205 Woodside Avenue (added 1985)
De Gray House – 650 Ewing Avenue (added 1983)
Packer House – 600 Ewing Avenue (added 1983)
Albert Pulis House – 322 Pulis Avenue (added 1983)
Reaction Motors Rocket Test Facility – 936 Dogwood Trail (added 1979)
Storms House – 1069 Franklin Lake Road (added 1984)
Van Blarcom House – 834 Franklin Lake Road (added 1984)
Van Houten House – 778 Vee Drive (added 1983)
Van Houten-Ackerman House – 1150 Franklin Lake Road (added 1983)
Van Koert-Winters House – 615 Franklin Avenue (added 1984)
Van Winkle House – 798 Franklin Lake Road (added 1984)
Aaron Winters House – 358 Woodside Avenue (added 1984)
Winters-Courter House – 831 Circle Avenue (added 1983)

References

Sources
 Municipal Incorporations of the State of New Jersey (according to Counties) prepared by the Division of Local Government, Department of the Treasury (New Jersey); December 1, 1958.
 Clayton, W. Woodford; and Nelson, Nelson. History of Bergen and Passaic Counties, New Jersey, with Biographical Sketches of Many of its Pioneers and Prominent Men. Philadelphia: Everts and Peck, 1882.
 Harvey, Cornelius Burnham (ed.), Genealogical History of Hudson and Bergen Counties, New Jersey. New York: New Jersey Genealogical Publishing Co., 1900.
 Van Valen, James M. History of Bergen County, New Jersey. New York: New Jersey Publishing and Engraving Co., 1900.
 Westervelt, Frances A. (Frances Augusta), 1858–1942, History of Bergen County, New Jersey, 1630–1923, Lewis Historical Publishing Company, 1923.

External links

 Franklin Lakes official website
 Franklin Lakes Fire Department
 Franklin Lakes Public Schools
 
 School Data for the Franklin Lakes Public Schools, National Center for Education Statistics
 Ramapo Indian Hills Regional High School District website
 Franklin Lakes Public Library
 The Franklin Lakes Journal
 Former Franklin Lakes Nike missile site

 
1922 establishments in New Jersey
Borough form of New Jersey government
Boroughs in Bergen County, New Jersey
Populated places established in 1922